General elections were held in Liberia in May 1955. For the first time since 1931 there was more than one candidate in the presidential election. However, William Tubman of the True Whig Party was easily re-elected, winning over 99.5% of the vote.

Results

References

Liberia
1955 in Liberia
Elections in Liberia
May 1955 events in Africa
Election and referendum articles with incomplete results